Rufus Sanders Goldney (6 August 1883 – 5 August 1966) was an Australian politician who represented the South Australian House of Assembly seat of Gouger from 1944 to 1959 for the Liberal and Country League.

References

 

1883 births
1966 deaths
Members of the South Australian House of Assembly
Liberal and Country League politicians
20th-century Australian politicians
Place of birth missing
Place of death missing